The 2007–08 Minnesota Timberwolves season was their 19th season in the NBA and their first since the 1994-95 season that Kevin Garnett was not on the roster as he was traded to the Boston Celtics during the summer.

Draft picks
Minnesota's selections from the 2007 NBA draft in New York City.

Roster

Regular season

Season standings

Record vs. opponents

Game log

|- bgcolor="edbebf"
| 1 || November 2 || Nuggets || 91–99 || McCants (23) || Jefferson (13) || Telfair (5) ||Target Center19,443 || 0–1
|- bgcolor="edbebf"
| 2 || November 4 || @ Knicks || 93–97 || Gomes (19) || Jefferson (12) || Telfair (7) ||Madison Square Garden19,763 || 0–2
|- bgcolor="edbebf"
| 3 || November 6 || Magic || 103–111 || Jefferson (25) || Jefferson (10) || Jaric (10) ||Target Center12,003 || 0–3
|- bgcolor="edbebf"
| 4 || November 9 || @ Lakers || 93–107 || Jefferson (24) || Jefferson (15) || Jaric (6) ||Staples Center18,997 || 0–4
|- bgcolor="edbebf"
| 5 || November 10 || @ Kings || 93–100 || Jefferson (17) || Jefferson (12) || Buckner (5) ||ARCO Arena13,170 || 0–5
|- bgcolor="bbffbb"
| 6 || November 14 || Kings || 108–103 || McCants (33) || Jaric (8) || Telfair (8) ||Target Center11,656 || 1–5
|- bgcolor="edbebf"
| 7 || November 16 || Wizards || 89–105 || McCants (19) || Jefferson (10) || Jaric (4) ||Target Center11,783 || 1–6
|- bgcolor="edbebf"
| 8 || November 17 || Hornets || 82–100 || Jefferson (20) || Jefferson (10) || Three-way tie (3) ||Target Center15,324 || 1–7
|- bgcolor="edbebf"
| 9 || November 21 || Cavaliers || 86–97 || Jefferson (30) || Jefferson (8) || Two-way tie (4) ||Target Center15,224 || 1–8
|- bgcolor="edbebf"
| 10 || November 23 || @ Nuggets || 93–99 || Walker (24) || Jefferson (14) || Jaric (6) ||Pepsi Center17,097 || 1–9
|- bgcolor="edbebf"
| 11 || November 24 || Hawks || 87–94 || Jefferson (23) || Jefferson (16) || Jaric (6) ||Target Center14,101 || 1–10
|- bgcolor="bbffbb"
| 12 || November 26 || @ Hornets || 103–94 || Jaric (21) || Buckner (9) || Telfair (8) ||New Orleans Arena8,393 || 2–10
|- bgcolor="edbebf"
| 13 || November 28 || @ Mavericks || 103–109 || Jefferson (31) || Jefferson (14) || Jaric (7) ||American Airlines Center20,054 || 2–11
|- bgcolor="edbebf"
| 14 || November 30 || Spurs || 91–106 || Jefferson (23) || Jefferson (11) || Two-way tie (4) ||Target Center16,297 || 2–12
|-

|- bgcolor="edbebf"
| 15 || December 1 || @ Grizzlies || 80–109 || McCants (18) || Walker (9) || Telfair (6) ||FedExForum12,896 || 2–13
|- bgcolor="edbebf"
| 16 || December 4 || Lakers || 95–116 || Telfair (16) || Jefferson (12) || Three-way tie (3) ||Target Center17,513 || 2–14
|- bgcolor="edbebf"
| 17 || December 6 || @ Hawks || 89–90 || Smith (25) || Brewer (10) || Jaric (10) ||Philips Arena12,232 || 2–15
|- bgcolor="bbffbb"
| 18 || December 8 || Suns || 100–93 || Jefferson (32) || Jefferson (20) || Telfair (6) ||Target Center19,356 || 3–15
|- bgcolor="edbebf"
| 19 || December 11 || @ Wizards || 88–102 || Smith (36) || Brewer (9) || Telfair (10) ||Verizon Center12,177 || 3–16
|- bgcolor="edbebf"
| 20 || December 12 || @ 76ers || 94–98 || Jefferson (22) || Jefferson (11) || Telfair (11) ||Wachovia Center10,971 || 3–17
|- bgcolor="edbebf"
| 21 || December 14 || Sonics || 88–99 || Jefferson (22) || Jefferson (16) || Two-way tie (6) ||Target Center16,523 || 3–18
|- bgcolor="edbebf"
| 22 || December 15 || @ Bucks || 92–95 || Smith (30) || Jefferson (15) || Telfair (8) ||Bradley Center15,512 || 3–19
|- bgcolor="edbebf"
| 23 || December 17 || @ Heat || 87–91 || Jefferson (22) || Jefferson (20) || Telfair (6) ||AmericanAirlines Arena19,600 || 3–20
|- bgcolor="edbebf"
| 24 || December 19 || Warriors || 98–111 || Jefferson (24) || Jefferson (14) || Telfair (8) ||Target Center13,001 || 3–21
|- bgcolor="bbffbb"
| 25 || December 21 || Pacers || 131–118 || Jefferson (29) || Jefferson (13) || Telfair (11) ||Target Center15,379 || 4–21
|- bgcolor="edbebf"
| 26 || December 22 || @ Hornets || 76–110 || Gomes (20) || Jefferson (13) || Green (4) ||New Orleans Arena11,257 || 4–22
|- bgcolor="edbebf"
| 27 || December 26 || @ Warriors || 101–105 || Jefferson (20) || Jefferson (19) || Jaric (5) ||Oracle Arena19,596 || 4–23
|- bgcolor="edbebf"
| 28 || December 28 || @ Blazers || 98–109 || Jefferson (22) || Two-way tie (7) || Telfair (11) ||Rose Garden20,491 || 4–24
|- bgcolor="edbebf"
| 29 || December 29 || @ Sonics || 90–109 || Jefferson (17) || Two-way tie (8) || Telfair (6) ||KeyArena14,038 || 4–25
|- bgcolor="edbebf"
| 30 || December 31 || @ Clippers || 82–91 || Jefferson (22) || Two-way tie (15) || Telfair (7) ||Staples Center14,404 || 4–26
|-

Player statistics

*Total for entire season including previous team(s)

Awards and records

Transactions

Trades

February 22, 2008 The Houston Rockets acquired Gerald Green from the Minnesota Timberwolves in exchange for Kirk Snyder, a future 2010 draft choice, and cash considerations.

See also
 2007–08 NBA season

2007 in sports in Minnesota
2008 in sports in Minnesota
Minnesota Timberwolves seasons
2007–08 NBA season by team